Walter ("Red") Bainbridge, Jr. was an American figure skater.  He began skating in Washington state, when his father, geologist Walter H. Bainbridge, was posted there between 1938 and 1945.  He competed in ice dance with Lois Waring. He was the national champion with Waring in 1947-1949 and North American Champion in 1947 and 1949.  He was inducted into the Professional Skaters Association Hall of Fame in 2009.

Results
(with Waring)

Notes

Navigation

American male ice dancers
Living people
Year of birth missing (living people)